Utricularia sect. Oligocista is the largest section in the genus Utricularia. The 42 species in this section are small to medium-sized terrestrial carnivorous plants native throughout the tropics, with six species in the Americas, ten in Africa, five in Australia, and the remainder in Asia, with 17 mostly native to peninsular India. Alphonse Pyrame de Candolle originally described and published this section in 1844. Peter Taylor published his taxonomic monograph of Utricularia in 1986, in which he placed this section within subgenus Utricularia. More recent phylogenetic data and revisions have reinstated subgenus Bivalvaria and have placed this section within it.

Species

See also 
 List of Utricularia species

References 

Utricularia
Plant sections